Class 11 may refer to:

British Rail Class 11
GCR Class 11F
NSB El 11
SCORE Class 11, off-road racing Baja Bug
SNCB Class 11